Audea irioleuca is a moth of the family Erebidae. It is found in Australia, where it has been recorded from Queensland and the Northern Territory.

The wingspan is about 20 mm. Adults are pale grey with dark patches near the middle of the costa and the inner margin of the forewings. The hindwings are white with a black marginal band.

References

Moths described in 1897
Audea
Moths of Australia